United American Video (or in short: UAV) Corporation, and more commonly known as UAV Home Video or UAV Entertainment, was an American entertainment company founded in 1984 as a small local company originally located in Charlotte, North Carolina. Its headquarters would later relocate to a new location in 1996: Fort Mill. UAV was the longtime competitor of GoodTimes Entertainment, Anchor Bay Entertainment and Celebrity Home Video and many other sell-through home entertainment companies.

United American Video began in 1984, by "The Pettus Family" with four employees, 50 public domain titles and 200 professional grade VHS and Betamax recorders. The founders changed the name a few years later to UAV Corporation to better reflect its entry into the prerecorded music and PC software businesses. In 1991, it entered into an agreement with Viacom Enterprises to license titles of The Andy Griffith Show onto videocassette. The company had operated different sublabels like Gemstone Entertainment, Hep Cat Entertainment and Ovation Home Video to release videocassette titles and Karaoke Bay to release record label titles.

In 1992, UAV acquired 150 titles from the defunct VidAmerica, In 1993, UAV created a video gift pack that was designed specifically for all holiday stores under the Video Gift Pak brand line. In 1996, UAV relocated from Charlotte to Fort Mill into a custom built 100,000 square feet headquarters housing manufacturing, distribution and all sales and marketing functions. In 1994, the company began to produce several original titles that were made for videocassette, which included fitness videos starring Kathy Ireland, and children's animation. Also that year, UAV invested into their own CD-ROM technology and four new animated titles were introduced at the Summer Consumer Electronics Show. In 1999, UAV added 210,000 additional square feet to its headquarters and had over 600 employees at its height. In 2002, UAV was sold to a private equity firm.

On June 14, 2006, the private equity firm lost control of the company to the lenders and UAV filed, laying off over 300 employees, claiming payroll funding had been cut by its lenders. A week later, the total number of layoffs had increased by approximately 100 extra. On June 30, ContentFilm announced its intent to acquire Allumination Filmworks as well as certain assets from UAV Corporation and UAV Holdings. The acquisition was completed in September 2006. In 2017, Content Media Corporation was acquired by Kew Media Group;, which was later liquidated and collapsed in 2020, and the Kew Media Distribution library was later acquired by the Quiver Entertainment division of Quiver Distribution in 2020. Quiver is the current rights holder for most of UAV's original productions, while properties licensed by UAV are now owned by other distributors.

Products
Most of the products produced by the United American Video Corporation were VHS and DVD releases of movies, cartoons and TV shows that are now in the public domain, original productions and exclusive licenses, as well as a full line of music and computer software. Under their UAV Gold banner, UAV also distributed original production animated fairy tale adaptations, often released around the time of more popular and widely known theatrical releases by Disney or other major studios. Notable releases featured a 1993 Canadian English re-dub of Osamu Tezuka's Kimba the White Lion (originally shown in Japan in 1965), The Secret of the Hunchback, The Secret of Anastasia, Young Pocahontas, The Secret of Mulan, Moses: Egypt's Great Prince, The Adventures of Tarzan, and Hans Christian Andersen's The Little Mermaid (originally released in Japan in 1975, removing approximately 2 minutes of footage containing shots of topless nudity in 2001).  UAV also had the exclusive licenses for the entire MTM Enterprises library which included The Mary Tyler Moore Show, Hill Street Blues and The White Shadow. They also distributed many public domain episodes of TV shows, including The Beverly Hillbillies, The Dick Van Dyke Show, The Andy Griffith Show and The Lucy Show. UAV also released DVDs and VHS tapes of DIC Entertainment shows beginning in 2003.

See also
Public domain

References

2006 disestablishments in South Carolina
American companies established in 1984
Companies based in Charlotte, North Carolina
Defunct companies based in North Carolina
Entertainment companies established in 1984
Entertainment companies of the United States
Companies disestablished in 2006
Companies that filed for Chapter 11 bankruptcy in 2018